Lingyu may refer to:

Volkswagen Passat Lingyu, car model
The World of Fantasy, 2021 Chinese TV series